Boggabilla  is a small town in the far north of inland New South Wales, Australia in Moree Plains Shire.

The name Boggabilla comes from Gamilaraay bagaaybila, literally "full of creeks". The same "creek" element is found in the name of Boggabri.

Geography 
Boggabilla is located on the Newell Highway north of Moree. Toomelah Station  is within the locality and the town of Goondiwindi is nearby, across the border in Queensland.

Population
 Aboriginal and Torres Strait Islander people made up 62.7% of the population. 
 About 91.3% of people were born in Australia and 89.5% of people only spoke English at home.
 The most common responses for religion  were Anglican 52.7% and no religion 22.2%.

Transport 
Boggabilla used to have a railway service, but this has been cut back to North Star, New South Wales, where the last silo is located. Also, an airport and shuttle services are available to Sydney from Moree located 110 km south of Boggabilla. Daily bus services run both north and south.

Health 
The nurses at Boggabilla Health Centre provide services such as preschool screening and immunisation.

Education 
Boggabilla has a school (Boggabilla Central School with preparatory, primary, and secondary grades) and a TAFE (a campus of TAFE NSW).

References

External links

Boggabilla Photo Gallery
Boggabilla 2011 Floods

Towns in New South Wales
Moree Plains Shire
Newell Highway